Ilbak is a village in Kandahar Province, in southern Afghanistan.

References

Populated places in Kandahar Province